Pendell is a ghost town in Bosque County, in the U.S. state of Texas.

History
The only operating business in Pendell was a service station, with the community having a population from 20 to 25 in the 1940s. It was abandoned by the next decade and no longer appeared on maps in 1984.

Geography

Education
Today, Pendell is located within the Clifton Independent School District.

References

Ghost towns in Texas